"Eyes Open" is a song written and recorded by American singer-songwriter Taylor Swift for The Hunger Games movie soundtrack, The Hunger Games: Songs from District 12 and Beyond, though the song is not included in the film itself. Produced by Swift and Nathan Chapman, it was released as the second single from the album and was sent to mainstream radio on March 27, 2012. A lyric video consisting of animation was released on Vevo in May 2012.

A re-recording of the song, titled "Eyes Open (Taylor's Version)", was released on March 17, 2023, via Republic Records. The re-recording is part of Swift's plan to re-record her back catalog, following the dispute over the ownership of the masters of her first six albums.

Background
The song was one of two songs that Swift wrote and recorded for the soundtrack to the film, The Hunger Games, the other song being "Safe & Sound". Swift first premiered the song during a performance in Auckland for her Speak Now World Tour, before launching into the song she told the crowd: "I'm really excited about it...but, I mean, you don't think I'd get in trouble if I played it now? Probably not, right?". The song was leaked before its official release date of March 20, 2012. A music video comprised as a lyric video was released on May 17, 2012, on Swift's Vevo account. The video consists of animation with the song's lyrics.

Composition
"Eyes Open" is a song of four minutes and four seconds in length. Critics described the song's genre as rock and alternative rock. According to Swift, she wrote the song about Katniss's "relationship" with the Capitol. Swift describes the song as the opposite of the melancholic "Safe & Sound," stating that "[it is] more frantic and fast-paced, a completely different shade of music."

Critical reception
The song garnered general critical acclaim from contemporary critics - most of whom favorably noted the song's more rock-oriented tone as compared to her previous releases. While reviewing The Hunger Games: Songs from District 12 and Beyond, Matt Bjorke named "Eyes Open" as one of the "standouts" on the record. Jason Lipshutz of Billboard also found the same description of the song - stating that it "[exists] more in the modern rock vein than her usual country-pop oeuvre." In June 2022, Insider ranked "Eyes Open" as Swift's third best soundtrack song, only behind "Safe & Sound" and "I Don't Wanna Live Forever".

Awards and nominations

Lyric video
A lyric video for the song was released on Swift's YouTube channel on May 17, 2012.  the video has over 20 million views.

Commercial performance
Upon the soundtrack's release, "Eyes Open" entered the US Billboard Hot 100 at number 19 with first-week sales of 176,000 downloads as the week's highest debut. After it was released to mainstream radio, the song debuted on Billboard's Mainstream Top 40 airplay chart at number 28, making it Swift's highest debut to date; it would later reach number 20 on the chart. "Eyes Open" became Swift's 16th million-seller and her second million-seller from the soundtrack. On December 17, 2022, it received a platnium certification from the Recording Industry Association of America (RIAA). The song has sold 1.4 million copies in the United States as of November 2017.

In New Zealand, "Eyes Open" debuted at its peak of number six on the RMNZ's Top 40 Singles chart and was certified gold by Recorded Music NZ (RMNZ). Elsewhere, the song peaked on various Anglophone territories, at number 47 in Australia, number 17 in Canada, number 65 in Ireland, and number 70 in the United Kingdom.

Charts

Certifications

Release history

"Eyes Open (Taylor's Version)"

A re-recorded version of "Eyes Open", titled "Eyes Open (Taylor's Version)", was released by Swift on March 17, 2023, via Republic Records. The song is part of Swift's re-recording plan following the dispute over the ownership of the masters of her older discography.

Release history

References

External links
 

2012 singles
Taylor Swift songs
The Hunger Games music
Songs written by Taylor Swift
Rock ballads
2010s ballads
Song recordings produced by Taylor Swift
Song recordings produced by Nathan Chapman (record producer)
Song recordings produced by Chris Rowe
2012 songs
Alternative rock songs